Jerry Ciccoritti (born August 5, 1956) is a Canadian film, television and theatre director.  His ability to work in a number of genres and for many mediums has made him one of the most successful directors in the country.

Biography 
Born in Toronto, Ciccoritti became active in amateur drama in high school and was one of the founders of Buddies in Bad Times theatre in 1978 and of the Rhubarb Theatre Festival in 1979.  He attended the film program at York University but dropped out to work in the burgeoning Toronto film industry.

He co-produced, co-wrote, and directed the low-budget horror film Psycho Girls (1985).  Several other genre films followed, eventually leading to  work in episodic television and television movies. Ciccoritti was instrumental in developing the TV series Catwalk (1992) and Straight Up (1996) and began a secondary career as a director of big-budget television movies and miniseries with Net Worth (1995), a drama about hockey player Ted Lindsay's battles with the National Hockey League on behalf of his fellow players.  Another popular film of Ciccoritti's that deals with Canadian history is Trudeau.

The director has also depicted the Italian-Canadian experience, with films like Boy Meets Girl (1998) and the television adaptation of Nino Ricci's Lives of the Saints. His theatrical release Blood (2004) was a well-received black comedy shot in one continuous take.  More recently, in 2012, Ciccoritti co-wrote, produced and directed the feature The Resurrection of Tony Gitone, a comedy set in Toronto's Little Italy.

Films 
His credits include the theatrical films The Life Before This, Blood, The Resurrection of Tony Gitone, and Paris, France. Television films include The Death and Life of Nancy Eaton, Net Worth, Lives of the Saints, Shania: A Life in Eight Albums, Chasing Cain, Trudeau, Victor and Dragon Boys. He has also directed episodic television, including Bomb Girls, Being Erica, Straight Up, ReGenesis, and King. In 2015, he directed episodes of the CBC situation comedy Schitt's Creek. In 2016, he directed the television miniseries 21 Thunder, which was expected to debut on CBC in 2017.

His most recent film, Lie Exposed, was released in 2019.

Awards 
Ciccoritti has been nominated for and won several Gemini Awards, including a record number of wins for Best Director (Television). He won the inaugural Canadian Screen Award for Best Direction in a Dramatic Program or Mini-Series for the CBC TV movie John A.: Birth of a Country.

Blood was nominated for a Genie Award for Best Original Screenplay at the 25th Genie Awards, and Ciccoritti was also nominated for a Directors Guild of Canada award for the movie.

Ciccoritti has also won three awards from the Directors Guild of Canada.

Quotes 
"I hate to be the guy who keeps the old saw going of comparing us to the States, but if you direct a whole bunch of really quality MOWs for HBO and you get a bunch of Emmys, your phone is ringing off the hook. Everybody wants to work with you. Up here it just doesn't happen. I don't know why."

References

External links
 

1956 births
Canadian television directors
Canadian Screen Award winners
Film directors from Toronto
Canadian people of Italian descent
Living people
Canadian Comedy Award winners